This a list of articles containing Chinese emperors family trees:

 Family tree of Chinese monarchs (ancient)
 Family tree of Chinese monarchs (Warring States period)
 Family tree of Chinese monarchs (early)
 Family tree of Chinese monarchs (middle)
 Family tree of Chinese monarchs (late)

Chinese royalty